A geminal diol (or gem-diol for short) is any organic compound having two hydroxyl functional groups (-OH) bound to the same carbon atom. Geminal diols are a subclass of the diols, which in turn are a special class of alcohols. Most of the geminal diols are considered unstable.

Other examples are:
dihydroxymalonic acid 
decahydroxycyclopentane 
chloral hydrate .

Reactions

Hydration equilibrium
Geminal diols can be viewed as ketone (or aldehyde) hydrates. The two hydroxyl groups in a geminal diol are easily converted to a carbonyl or keto group C=O by loss of one water molecule.  Conversely, a keto group can combine with water to form the geminal hydroxyl groups.

The equilibrium in water solution may be shifted towards either compound. For example, the equilibrium constant for the conversion of acetone =O to propane-2,2-diol  is about 10−3, while that of formaldehyde =O to methanediol  is 103. 

For conversion of hexafluoroacetone =O to the diol , the constant is about 10+6, due to the electron withdrawing effect of the trifluoromethyl groups. Similarly, the conversion of chloral =O to chloral hydrate is strongly favored by influence of the trichloromethyl group.

In some cases, such as decahydroxycyclopentane and dodecahydroxycyclohexane, the geminal diol is stable while the  corresponding ketone is not. 

Geminal diols can also be viewed as extreme cases of hemiacetals, formed by reaction of carbonyl compounds with water, instead of with an alcohol.

See also
Hemiacetal
Geminal
Vicinal (chemistry)

References